Line S8 of the Nanjing Metro, is a north–south suburban metro line serving the northern suburbs of Nanjing. It will eventually extended to Tianchang in Anhui.

Opening timeline

Station list

References

External links 
Line S8 on the official Nanjing Metro website (includes route map) 

Nanjing Metro lines
Railway lines opened in 2014
2014 establishments in China